Joseph Ignatius Langtry (2 September 1880 – 30 April 1951) was an Australian politician. Born in Kyabram, Victoria, he received a primary education before becoming a teamster. He moved to Barellan in New South Wales and became a wheatfarmer and publican. In 1940, he was the Labor candidate for the Australian House of Representatives seat of Riverina; he was successful in this, defeating Country Party member Horace Nock. He held the seat until 1949, when he was defeated by Country candidate Hugh Roberton. Langtry died in 1951 in Griffith.

References

1880 births
1951 deaths
Australian Labor Party members of the Parliament of Australia
Members of the Australian House of Representatives for Riverina
Members of the Australian House of Representatives
20th-century Australian politicians